Omiodes indistincta is a Crambidae family moth. Warren first discovered it in 1892. It may be found in Japan and China.

References

Moths described in 1892
indistincta